The 1946 Furman Purple Hurricane football team was an American football team that represented Furman University as a member of the Southern Conference (SoCon) during the 1946 college football season. In their first season under head coach Bob Smith, Furman compiled an overall record of 2–8 with a mark of 1–4 in conference play, tying for 13th place in the SoCon.

Schedule

References

Furman
Furman Paladins football seasons
Furman Purple Hurricane football